Robert Calvo is a Vanuatuan professional football manager.

Career
Since 2007 until 2008 he coached the Vanuatu national football team.

References

External links

Profile at Soccerpunter.com

Year of birth missing (living people)
Living people
Vanuatuan football managers
Vanuatu national football team managers
Place of birth missing (living people)